Very Mercenary is the third studio album by The Herbaliser. It was released on Ninja Tune in 1999. It peaked at number 19 on the UK Independent Albums Chart.

Critical reception
Keith Farley of AllMusic gave the album 4 stars out of 5, saying, "the Herbaliser's third album works in '60s spy-funk territory to a degree unseen in the group's discography."

Track listing

Charts

References

External links
 

1999 albums
The Herbaliser albums
Ninja Tune albums